Only 38 is a lost 1923 American drama silent film directed by William C. deMille and written by Clara Beranger, Walter Prichard Eaton and A.E. Thomas. The film stars May McAvoy, Lois Wilson, Elliott Dexter, George Fawcett, Robert Agnew and Jane Keckley. The film was released on June 17, 1923, by Paramount Pictures.

Cast
May McAvoy as Lucy Stanley
Lois Wilson as Mrs. Stanley
Elliott Dexter as Professor Charles Giddings
George Fawcett as Hiram Sanborn
Robert Agnew as Bob Stanley
Jane Keckley as Mrs. Newcomb
Lillian Leighton as Mrs. Peters
Taylor Graves as Sydney Johnson
Anne Cornwall as Mary Hedley

References

External links

1923 films
1920s English-language films
Silent American drama films
1923 drama films
Paramount Pictures films
Films directed by William C. deMille
American black-and-white films
Lost American films
American silent feature films
1923 lost films
Lost drama films
1920s American films